"The Sandman Saga" is a Superman story arc published in 1971 in Superman (Vol. 1) #233 - 235, #237 - 238 and  #240 - 242. This is the first Superman storyline under editor Julius Schwartz and the first Bronze Age-era Superman story.

History
In 1971, DC attempted to revamp and streamline the Superman universe, "de-powering" Superman so that he was no longer a god-like character who was impossible to beat.

Many of the concepts introduced during this time, such as a powered-down Superman, Intergang, the Cadmus Project, the Guardian and Darkseid, would later be used in the Post-Crisis incarnation of Superman that first appeared in John Byrne's The Man of Steel.

Mort Weisinger, the editor on the Superman titles, retired from his 30-year career at DC at the end of 1970. A prolific editor, DC replaced him with four people: Mike Sekowsky (Adventure Comics and Supergirl), Murray Boltinoff (Superboy, Action Comics and Superman's Pal Jimmy Olsen), E. Nelson Bridwell (Superman's Girl Friend, Lois Lane) and Julius Schwartz (World's Finest and Superman). The new editors streamlined the Superman mythos: things like kryptonite, imaginary stories, Mister Mxyzptlk, Bizarro, Krypto the Superdog, Jimmy Olsen's Elastic Lad stories, Lana Lang's Insect Queen stories and Titano the Super-Ape would all be removed and forgotten.

After a series of house ads including two-page center-spreads, DC published Superman #233 in January 1971. With the tagline The Amazing New Adventures of above the Superman title, and the displayed "1" which was actually part of the slogan "Number 1 Best-Selling Comics Magazine", it led some to believe that the book was actually called The Amazing New Adventures of Superman #1. Writer Denny O'Neil, known from his memorable runs on the Batman books and Green Lantern/Green Arrow and artists Curt Swan and Murphy Anderson began the "Sandman Saga" in this issue. The story would open up with an archetypal situation where a scientist is trying to create an engine powered by kryptonite when the experiment goes awry. However, because of this "freak accident", all kryptonite on Earth becomes nothing more than harmless iron. Following this development, Clark Kent is reassigned by his new boss, Morgan Edge, as a television reporter of WGBS, and O'Neil dumps the wimpy-Clark Kent persona.

Aftermath
After the conclusion of the storyline, DC pulled the plug on this "new" incarnation and Cary Bates came in to script Superman #243. It is possible that DC was competing with its past and followed the advice of those fans who were more interested in seeing cosmic conflicts. While the "new" Superman still occasionally popped up, O'Neil's vision of Superman disappeared after the final "Sandman Saga" issue. In 1992, Walt Simonson wrote and drew a Post-Crisis version of the "Sandman Saga" in Superman Special #1.

Collection
In January 2009, the storyline was collected as Volume 1 of the DC Comics Classics Library and titled  Superman: Kryptonite Nevermore. It was later reprinted as a stand-alone trade paperback in 2012 and a 50th anniversary hardcover edition in 2021.

References

External links
History of The Sandman Saga
Adaptation of The Sandman Saga
Superman Adventures #54
Superman Adventures #55

Comics by Dennis O'Neil
Sandman